was a Japanese whisky distillery.  It was located at Miyota, a town on the southern slopes of an active complex volcano, Mount Asama, in Kitasaku District, Nagano Prefecture, Japan.

Established in 1955, the distillery began production in 1956.  It was owned by Mercian Corporation, and was the smallest in Japan.  It was mothballed in 2000, and closed in 2011; the land on which it had stood was sold in 2012.
The remaining whisky stock from the distillery was purchased and re-branded, then released as a series of luxury whiskies. The rarest of these is the 1960 vintage, which is on sale at US$638,000 per bottle.

References

External links

Karuizawa Distillery – Learn About the Karuizawa Distillery

This article is based upon a translation of the French language version as at June 2014.

Distilleries in Japan
Japanese whisky
1955 establishments in Japan